"Iść w stronę słońca" is a 1981 song by Polish band 2 Plus 1.

Song information
The song was composed by the band's leader Janusz Kruk, and the lyrics were written by Andrzej Mogielnicki, a popular Polish lyricist. It was first released on a cardboard record by Tonpress in 1981, a popular medium often replacing the single format in the pre-1990s Poland. In the same year, the track appeared on a various artists EP VIII konkurs na piosenkę dla młodzieży, which also included songs by such popular Polish acts as Izabela Trojanowska and Kombi. A live version of the song was included on 2 Plus 1's 1986 compilation Greatest Hits Live, and the studio recording on the 1991's 18 Greatest Hits. "Iść w stronę słońca" is regarded as one of 2 Plus 1's biggest hits, as well as the so-called "evergreen", since it has become deeply rooted in the history of Polish popular music.

Music video
The music video for the song pictures the band strolling around the forest and along Vistula.

References

1981 songs
Polish songs
Polish-language songs
Songs written by Janusz Kruk